The 1996 Pro Tour season was the first season of the Magic: The Gathering Pro Tour. At the end of 1995 Wizards of the Coast had announced the introduction of a tournament series featuring big cash prizes. Originally coined the "Black Lotus Pro Tour" the tournaments were simply called "Pro Tours" and the name was thus changed quickly. The first Pro Tour, held in New York in February 1996, was won by the American Michael Loconto. Los Angeles and Ohio were the other Pro Tours in the inaugural season along with the 1996 World Championships in Seattle. At the end of the season Olle Råde was proclaimed the first Pro Tour Player of the Year.

Mode 

Four Pro Tours were held in the 1996 season. As Grand Prixs had not been introduced those Pro Tours were the only events to award Pro Points. Based on final standings Pro Points were awarded as follows:

Pro Tour – New York (17–18 February 1996) 

Pro Tour New York was the first Pro Tour ever held. As Wizards tried to find an adequate tournament mode for a professional circuit several things were done different in New York than at later Pro Tours. However, the rule that the starting player gets to skip his first draw step was introduced in this tournament, and persisted. While being the first Magic tournament to award sizeable cash prizes, the total amount of $30,000 was still small compared to subsequent Pro Tours which featured prizes well in excess of $300,000. The tournament consisted of only seven rounds of Swiss play, which were followed by a cut to top 16. Those 16 players returned on Sunday to determine the winner in four rounds of single elimination. Furthermore, PT New York was the only Pro Tour to feature a non-standard format. Instead a modification of Type II was used, forcing every player to use at least five cards from every set, legal in Type II at that time. New York also introduced the play-draw rule to reduce the advantage of beginning the game. Previously the starting player would draw a card on his first turn. Instead the player winning the die roll now would have to decide whether to "play first" and thereby forfeit their first draw step or "draw first" and thus playing second.

Pro Tour New York is also known as PT Speed Dial, because players had to call the Wizards of the Coast offices to register for one of the available slots. Several players, considered by Wizards of the Coast to be the best at the game, were also invited to play to make the inaugural tournament more attractive. Eventually the first PT started off on a sour note, being delayed by four hours due to a snow storm.

The top 8 featured Eric Tam, the current Canadian national champion, and Bertrand Lestrée, vice-champion of the first World Championship in 1994. Mark Justice, who was by most perceived to be the best of world at that time, also made it to the final eight, but eventually the rather unknown Michael Loconto took the title in a final that was supposed to be best of seven games, but was eventually reduced to a best of three after the first two games had taken so long.

Tournament data 
Prize pool: $30,000 ($60,000 including scholarships for the Junior Division)
Players: 239
Format: Standard, New York Style (Decks must have five cards from each available expansion in either deck or sideboard)

Top 8

Final standings

Junior division 

Pro Tour New York, just as most of the other early Pro Tours, had a Junior Division for underage players. It was won by Graham Tatomer in a final against Aaron Kline. The first prize was a $12,000 scholarship. The semi-finalists were Maxwell Suver, and Ross Sclafani, and the quarter-finalists were Brendon Herzog, Jon Finkel, Jason Norment, and Nate Foure.

Pro Tour – Los Angeles (3–5 May 1996) 

In contrast to New York the PT Los Angeles was an invite-only tournament as were all subsequent Pro Tours. Los Angeles was also the first major tournament to feature only Limited play. The all-American top 8 featured several big names, including Darwin Kastle and Scott Johns as well as Shawn Hammer and Preston Poulter who had already made it to the final stage in New York. This time Shawn "Hammer" Reigner took the title, defeating Thomas Guevin in a five-hour final match.

Tournament data 
Prize pool: $100,000 ($130,000 including scholarships for the Junior Division)
Players: 179
Format: Booster Draft (4th Edition-4th Edition-Homelands)
Head Judge: Tom Wylie

Top 8

Final standings

Junior Division 

Max Szlager won the Junior Division over Paul McCabe. The other semi-finalists were Brian Wilson and Jason Norment.

Pro Player of the year standings

Pro Tour – Columbus (6–7 July 1996) 

PT Columbus is known to be the shortest Pro Tour ever. It was held at the Origins convention in conjunction with the US Nationals and had scheduled the Nationals Top 4 as well as the Swiss portion of the PT on Saturday. On Sunday, after 14 rounds of Swiss, the top 4 of the Pro Tour were played out in single-elimination to determine the winner. Columbus featured an all-new kind of format in Block Constructed, allowing only cards from Ice Age and Alliances. In the final Olle Råde, also known as "the little Viking" defeated Sean Fleischman to become the first Pro Tour winner not coming from the USA. Råde was only 17 years old and had elected to play in the master division of the tournament despite still being eligible for the junior division. He won the tournament with an aggressive green-red deck. Terry Borer won the Junior Division over Paul McCabe. Scott Johns finished amongst the best eight players as he did in the previous and would in the subsequent Pro Tour. However, as the tournament was cut to a Top 4 his three consecutive Top 8 finishes did not draw that much attention.

Tournament data 
Prize pool: $125,000 ($155,000 including scholarships for the Junior Division)
Players: 136
Format: Ice Age Block Constructed (Ice Age, Alliances)
Head Judge: Tom Wylie

Top 4

Final standings

Pro Player of the year standings

1996 World Championships – Seattle (14–18 August 1996) 

The 1996 World Championship was held at the Wizards of the Coast headquarters in Seattle and became the Pro Tour with the fewest competitors ever. Scott Johns reached his third consecutive Pro Tour top 8 within a season, a feat not yet achieved by anybody else. Also amongst the final eight were Mark Justice and Henry Stern who had finished a joint third at the previous World Championships. Eventually Tom Chanpheng from Australia became World Champion and the United States defended their team title.

Tournament data 
Prize pool: $132,000
Players: 125
Formats: Booster Draft, Standard, Type 1.5, Team Sealed

Final standings

National team competition 

  United States (Dennis Bentley, George Baxter, Mike Long, Matt Place)
  Czech Republic (David Korejtko, Jakub Slemr, Ondrej Baudys, Lukas Kocourek)

Pro Player of the year final standings 

At the end of the season Olle Råde was awarded Pro Player of the Year despite having competed in only two Pro Tours, winning one and finishing fourth in the other.

References 

Magic: The Gathering professional events